The Hàm Thuận – Đa Mi Hydroelectric Power Complex is a cascade of two hydroelectric power stations in Hàm Thuận Bắc District of the central region of Vietnam.  It is operated by Da Nhim – Ham Thuan – Da Mi Hydropower Joint Stock Co., a subsidiary of Vietnam Electricity. The same company also operates the older Đa Nhim Hydroelectric Power Station.

History
A feasibility study of the project was conducted by the Vietnamese government in 1991. Construction began in 1997 and both stations were opened in 2001.  The main contractors of the project were Tomen Corporation, Ansaldo Energia, Fuji Electric, Hitachi Zosen Corporation, SsangYong, Hyundai Corporation, Maeda Corporation, Kumagai Gumi, Astaldi, Kukdong Engineering & Construction Co Ltd., and Nissho Iwai Corporation. Consulting services were provided by Electric Power Development Company and Nippon Koei.  The project cost ¥70.145 million, of which 59.623 million was borrowed from the Japan Bank for International Cooperation.

Hàm Thuận
The Hàm Thuận dams are located on the La Ngà River and consist of one main dam and four auxiliary dams. The main dam is a rockfill, center impervious core type of dam. Auxiliary dams are of the earthfill homogeneous type.

The Hàm Thuận power station has an installed capacity of 300 MW.  It consists of two units with a capacity of 150 MW each.

Đa Mi
The Đa Mi Dam impounds the Đa Mi River. The reservoir is daily regulated from the Hàm Thuận Reservoir.

The power station has an installed capacity of 175 MW, consisting of two units each with a capacity of 87.5 MW.

The complex also provides water to the Trị An Hydroelectric Power Station downstream of the Đa Mi power station along the Đồng Nai river.

References

Hydroelectric power stations in Vietnam
Buildings and structures in Bình Thuận province
Dams in Vietnam